Brandon Proctor is an American sound engineer. He was nominated for the Academy Award for Best Sound for the film Black Panther (2018).

Selected filmography 
 All Is Lost (2013)
 A Quiet Place (2018)
 Black Panther (2018; co-nominated for the Academy Award for Best Sound with Steve Boeddeker and Peter J. Devlin)

References

External links 
 

Living people
Place of birth missing (living people)
Year of birth missing (living people)
American audio engineers
20th-century American engineers
21st-century American engineers